St. Paul's Episcopal Church is a historic Episcopal church located at the northwestern corner of Knob and Reynolds Streets in Ironton, Iron County, Missouri. It was built in 1870–1871, and is a rectangular, Gothic Revival style frame building.  It measures 23 feet by 60 feet.  It has a steep ridge roof and three story corner bell tower.

It was listed on the National Register of Historic Places in 1969.

References

Churches completed in 1871
Episcopal church buildings in Missouri
Churches on the National Register of Historic Places in Missouri
Gothic Revival church buildings in Missouri
Buildings and structures in Iron County, Missouri
19th-century Episcopal church buildings
National Register of Historic Places in Iron County, Missouri